Moodswing is the 2003 album by Kacy Crowley. It was released independently and is popular in Crowley's hometown of Austin, Texas.

Track listing 

 "Everything" 
 "Kind of Perfect"
 "Unrecovered"
 "Ashes"
 "Suspended"
 "Holding in the World"
 "Blood"
 "Church Organ"
 "Traffic"
 "Humble Beginnings"

References

2003 albums
Kacy Crowley albums